Mai Loc Camp (also known as Firebase Mai Loc and Firebase Victory) was a U.S. Army and Army of the Republic of Vietnam (ARVN) base located west of Quảng Trị in central Vietnam.

History

Mai Loc was located approximately 8 km southwest of Ca Lu Combat Base and 25 km west of Quảng Trị.

The 5th Special Forces Group first established the base here in early 1968.

The 3rd Brigade, 101st Airborne Division comprising:
3rd Battalion, 187th Infantry
1st Battalion, 506th Infantry
2nd Battalion, 506th Infantry
supported by 2nd Battalion, 319th Artillery was based here in October–November 1969.

On 9 April 1970 at 23:00 a Tripflare was activated on the perimeter of the camp alerting the defenders. At 02:35 on 10 April the camp was hit by 75-100 82mm mortar and Rocket-propelled grenade rounds followed by a sapper attack. The Civilian Irregular Defense Group (CIDG) forces, their Special Forces advisers and artillerymen with M42 Dusters defended the camp. The sappers penetrated the perimeter but were unable to reach the inner perimeter and tactical operations center. At 03:40 a unit from the 1st Brigade, 5th Infantry Division (Mechanized) reinforced the camp and helicopter gunships and a Republic of Vietnam Air Force (RVNAF) AC-47 Spooky gunship provided fire support. The People's Army of Vietnam (PAVN) forces withdrew by 04:55 leaving 19 dead; U.S. losses were six killed (including four members of the 14th Engineer Battalion) and 14 CIDG killed. U.S Special Forces left Mai Loc in late August 1970.

Other units based at Mai Loc included:
8th Battalion, 4th Artillery

On 2 April 1972 the 147th Marine Brigade abandoned Mai Loc in the face of the PAVN assault on Quảng Trị.

Current use
The base has been turned over to farmland.

References

Buildings and structures in Quảng Trị province
Installations of the United States Army in South Vietnam
Installations of the Army of the Republic of Vietnam
Military installations closed in the 1970s